Arun Kumar V.R. is an Indian film producer, distributor, cinema exhibitor who works in Malayalam film industry. He began his career as executive producer  in 2011 with Amal Neerad productions and started  career as  producer  in Malayalam films in 2021.He established the film production house Film roll, which  exclusively produces Malayalam  films. He is an active member of  Malayalam film producers Association.

Filmography

References

External links 
 

Malayali people
Malayalam film producers
Film producers from Kerala
Businesspeople from Kerala
Film producers from Kochi
21st-century Indian businesspeople
Living people
1974 births